The Men's large hill team ski jumping competition for the 2006 Winter Olympics was held in Pragelato, Italy. It occurred on 20 February.

Results

References

Ski jumping at the 2006 Winter Olympics